Events from the year 1932 in France.

Incumbents
President: Paul Doumer (until 7 May), Albert Lebrun (starting 10 May)
President of the Council of Ministers: 
 until 20 February: Pierre Laval
 20 February-3 June: Édouard Daladier
 3 June-26 November: Édouard Herriot
 starting 26 November: Joseph Paul-Boncour

Events
 1 May - Legislative Election held.
 6 May - Paul Gorguloff assassinates President Paul Doumer in Paris. Doumer dies the next day.
 8 May - Legislative Election held.
 10 May - Albert Lebrun becomes the new President of France.
 7 July - French submarine Prométhée sinks off Cherbourg - 66 dead.
 Aperitif Ricard first produced by Paul Ricard in Marseille.

Arts and literature
 14 January - Maurice Ravel's Concerto in G debuts with piano soloist Marguerite Long and Ravel conducting the Lamoureux Orchestra.

Sport
 6 July - Tour de France begins.
 31 July - Tour de France ends, won by André Leducq.

Births

January to June

 31 January – Raymond Kaelbel, international soccer player (d. 2007)
 6 February – François Truffaut, screenwriter, film director, producer and actor (d. 1984)
 18 February – Alphonse Halimi, boxer (d. 2006)
 19 February – Jean-Pierre Ponnelle, opera director (d. 1988)
 22 February – Robert Opron, automotive designer (d. 2021)
 24 February – Michel Legrand, composer, arranger, conductor and pianist (d. 2019)
 30 March – Ted Morgan, French-born biographer and journalist
 7 April – Françoise Dior, supporter of the postwar Nazi cause (d. 1993)
 12 April – Jean-Pierre Marielle, French actor (d. 2019)
 16 April – Pierre Milza, French historian (d. 2018)
 27 April – Anouk Aimée, born (Nicole) Françoise Dreyfus, film actress
 1 May – Charles Ducasse, soccer player (d. 1983)
 17 May – Archiguille, painter (d. 2017)
 21 May – Jean Stablinski, racing cyclist (d. 2007)

July to December

 1 July- Ze'ev Schiff, French-born Israeli military journalist (d. 2007)
 21 July - Marie-Claire Bancquart, poet and critic (d. 2019)
 22 July – Jean Barthe, French rugby league and rugby union player (d. 2017)
 17 August – Jean-Jacques Sempé, cartoonist (Le Petit Nicolas) (d. 2022)
 18 August – Luc Montagnier, French virologist and Nobel Prize winner (d. 2022)
 19 August - Jacques Lob, comic book creator (d. 1990)
 25 August - Gérard Lebovici, film producer, editor and impresario (d. 1984)
 24 September – Rose Combe, writer and railway worker (born 1883)
 1 October – Manuel Busto, French racing cyclist (d. 2017)
 13 October – Liliane Montevecchi, French-Italian actress, dancer and singer (d. 2018)
 24 October - Pierre-Gilles de Gennes, physicist and the Nobel Prize laureate in Physics in 1991 (d. 2007)
 27 October - Jean-Pierre Cassel, actor (d. 2007)
 30 October - Louis Malle, film director (d. 1995)
 8 November – Stéphane Audran, French actress (d. 2018)
 29 November - Jacques Chirac, President of France (d. 2019)
 1 December - Stéphane Bruey, international soccer player (d. 2005)
 15 December - Charles Bozon, alpine skier and world champion (d. 1964)

Full date unknown
 André Pascal, songwriter and composer (d. 2001)

Deaths

January to June
 7 January - André Maginot, politician, advocate of the Maginot Line (born 1877)
 February - Charles Gide, economist and historian of economic thought (born 1847)
 16 February
 Ferdinand Buisson, academic. pacifist, politician, awarded Nobel Peace Prize in 1927 (born 1841)
 Gustave-Auguste Ferrié, radio pioneer and army general (born 1868)
 28 February - Guillaume Bigourdan, astronomer (born 1851) 
 7 March - Aristide Briand, statesman, Prime Minister and Nobel Peace Prize winner (born 1862)
 3 May - Henri de Gaulle, bureaucrat, teacher and father of Charles de Gaulle (born 1848)
 24 March – Frantz Reichel, Olympic gold medalist in rugby (born 1871)
 7 May - Paul Doumer, President of France (assassinated) (born 1857)
 9 June - Émile Friant, painter (born 1863)
 29 June - Jean Marie Charles Abadie, ophthalmologist (born 1842)

July to December
 5 July - René-Louis Baire, mathematician (born 1874)
 18 July - Jean Jules Jusserand, author and diplomat (born 1855)
 20 July - René Bazin, novelist (born 1853)
 23 September - Jules Chéret, painter and lithographer (born 1836)
 15 October - Élisabeth Renaud, teacher, socialist activist, and feminist (born 1846)
 29 October - Rodolphe d'Erlanger, painter and musicologist (born 1872)

Full date unknown
 Léon Bouly, inventor who devised and created the cinématographe (born 1872)

See also
 Interwar France
 List of French films of 1932

References

1930s in France